Pterolophia horii is a species of beetle in the family Cerambycidae. It was described by Stephan von Breuning and Ohbayashi in 1970.

References

horii
Beetles described in 1970